Byun Jung-soo (born April 15, 1974) is a South Korean model and actress. As a model in the 1990s, Byun walked the runways in Seoul, Paris and New York, notably for the brand Kenzo. She began acting in 2002, and starred in television dramas such as Women Next Door (2003), You're Not Alone (2004), Can Love Be Refilled? (2005), Last Scandal (2008) and Manny (2011). In 2005, Byun became the creative director for clothing label Ellahoya, when it launched its higher-end line for the Hyundai Home Shopping Network. Known for her chic sense of style, in 2008 she became the host of talk show Olive Show, which featured trends in fashion. Byun also created the make-up line Licht in 2009, and has written three books.

Filmography

Film

Variety/radio show

Books

Awards and nominations

References

External links 
 Byun Jung-soo Fan Cafe at Daum 
 
 
 
 

1974 births
Living people
People from Seoul
Actresses from Seoul
20th-century South Korean actresses
21st-century South Korean actresses
South Korean television actresses
South Korean film actresses
South Korean female models
Gachon University alumni